Llanbedr is a village  and community   south of Harlech. Administratively, it lies in the Ardudwy area, formerly Meirionnydd, of the county of Gwynedd, Wales.

History
Ancient monuments at Llanbedr include Neolithic standing stones; the Stones of Llanbedr and Bronze Age hut circles.  
The village originally grew around the slate quarrying industry.
Glyn Pedr is a Victorian Grade II listed residence on Maes Ffynnon.

During the first world war Marian Antonia Gamwell who was a widow (became Mrs Owen) created a British Red Cross auxiliary hospital at her new home, the country house called Aber Artro, at Llanbedr.

Climate

Church and chapel
The church of St Peter, after whom the village is named (Pedr being the Welsh for Peter), is a Grade II* listed building.

In 2019 approval was given to convert Capel Moriah in Llanbedr, which had gone out of use, into a Mosque.

The painting, entitled Salem, showed a member of the congregation, Siân Owen, in traditional Welsh costume and became famous throughout Britain in the mid-20th century.

Airport
The village is home to Llanbedr Airport, a general aviation aerodrome. Until 2004, the site was operated as a military airfield by the Defence Evaluation and Research Agency (DERA) and QinetiQ as a launch site for remotely piloted drone 'aircraft' for use as aerial targets by the RAF and other UK forces. The airfield was included in the Snowdonia Enterprise Zone by the Welsh Government in January 2013.

In 2018, the airport became home to a flying school offering pleasure flights and flying lessons.

After the UK passed 2021 enabling legislation, in 2022, the Welsh Government announced plans to develop space launch capability at the site, to be named Spaceport Snowdonia.

Amenities

The Morfa Dyffryn sand dunes and Mochras (Shell Island) lie nearby. It has two public houses; Ty Mawr Hotel and The Victoria Inn.

To the north of the village is the smaller village of Pensarn, situated at the estuary of the river Artro. This is the location of Llanbedr & Pensarn Yacht Club and the Christian Mountain Centre, a residential adventure activity centre.

Railways
Llanbedr railway station, formerly known as Talwrn Bach Halt, is a little out of the village itself and is served by the Cambrian Line.

Governance
An electoral ward in the same name exists. This ward also covers the Community of Llanfair. The total ward population at the 2011 Census was 1,098.

Twinning
In 2008 Llanbedr was twinned with Huchenfeld, Germany, following many years of exchanges between schools, churches, musicians and community leaders, in remembrance of the occurrences at Pforzheim and Huchenfeld during the Second World War.

Notable people 
 Henry Lloyd (ca.1718 – 1783), a Welsh army officer and military writer.
 Katherine Mudge (1881–1975), a British archer. competed at the 1908 Summer Olympics in London. 
 Sir Philip Pullman CBE FRSL (born 1946), an English writer, his formative years were spent in Llanbedr in Ardudwy

See also
 Petrosomatoglyph St. Mary's footprints at Llan Maria.

References

External links 

www.geograph.co.uk : photos of Llanbedr and surrounding area
Llanbedr Community Council Website